Chandani: The Daughter of the Elephant Whisperer is a 2010 documentary by Arne Birkenstock. It tells the story of a Sinhalese girl, Chandani, who wants to break with tradition by becoming a mahout (a traditionally male occupation) like her father.

It was awarded with the German Film Award as best Children's Feature and as Best Documentary at the Chicago International Children's Film Festival.

References

External links 

Chandani - The daughter of the elephant whisperer on Asia Society
Chandani - The daughter of the elephant whisperer" at the Goethe Institut in The Sunday Times

German documentary films
Documentary films about elephants
2010 documentary films
2010 films
2010s Sinhala-language films
2010s German films